Images, first published in 1994 (now out of print), is a book by David Lynch.

Images Contents

Moving Images:
Twin Peaks: Fire Walk with Me
Industrial Symphony No. 1
Wild at Heart
Twin Peaks
The Cowboy and the Frenchman
Blue Velvet
Dune
The Elephant Man
Eraserhead
Alphabet
The Grandmother
The Amputee

Images:
Paintings and Drawings
Ricky Boards and Bee Boards
Industrial
Organic Phenomena
Fish Kit
Chicken Kit
Snowmen from Boise
Postmodern Mood Structures
Nudes and Smoke
Distributors
Spark Plugs
Meaningless Conversations
Dental Hygiene

1994 non-fiction books
Books by David Lynch
Books of photographs